Bayram Pasha (died 26 August 1638) was an Ottoman grand vizier from 1637 to 1638 and the Ottoman governor of Egypt from 1626 to 1628.

Life 
Bayram, was from Ladik, near the Anatolian city of Amasya. He was Turkish origin and was a member of the Janissary corps, which recruited heavily from Christian families of Greek, Georgian and Armenian origin from different parts of Anatolia. Although the Janissary corps was originally based on the devshirme system, beginning in the reign of Murat III (1574–1595), Turks were also admitted into the corps. In 1622, his title was turnacıbaşı (chief of recruiting teams), and in 1623, the kethüda (chamberlain). In 1625, he was appointed to Egypt (then an Ottoman territory) as the beylerbey (governor-general). In 1628, he was promoted to the rank of vizier. In 1635, Bayram Pasha was the kaymakam (a title almost equivalent to modern mayor) of the Ottoman capital, Constantinople. In 1637, during the reign of Murat IV (1623–1640), he was promoted to the rank of grand vizier, the highest office in the empire next to that of the sultan. Bayram Pasha participated in the Baghdad campaign led by the sultan. He died (of natural causes) near Urfa.

As a groom 
Bayram was also a damat (groom) of the palace. In Ottoman tradition, the daughters and sisters of the sultans usually married viziers. But Bayram's case was an exception, because Bayram was married to Hanzade Sultan, the daughter of Ahmet I (1603–1617) in 1623 while he was still a turnacıbaşı. They had a daughter. .

As a governor and a vizier 

Bayram Pasha was reputed both in Egypt and in Anatolia for his efforts in construction of public works. He repaired the city walls of Constantinople and commissioned a mosque and a külliye (religious complex) in the city. Today, the district of Bayrampaşa bears his name. He commissioned an irrigation facility and a caravansarai in Amasya. Bayram Pasha is also known as the commissioner of various inns in Anatolian towns.

As grand vizier, Bayram Pasha executed two princes by the order of the sultan. He is also known as the name behind the execution of the famous poet Nef'i for writing satirical poems. Nef'i had earlier promised not to compose any more satire, but when he broke this promise, he was executed at the request of Bayram Pasha.

See also 
 List of Ottoman Grand Viziers
 List of Ottoman governors of Egypt
 Bayrampaşa District in Istanbul

References 

1638 deaths
Pashas
17th-century Grand Viziers of the Ottoman Empire
17th-century Ottoman governors of Egypt
Year of birth unknown
People from Lâdik
Ottoman governors of Egypt
Damats
Ottoman people of the Ottoman–Persian Wars